"Love of My Life (An Ode to Hip-Hop)" is a song recorded by American singer Erykah Badu for the Brown Sugar soundtrack (2002). It features American rapper Common, who co-wrote the song alongside Badu, Madukwu Chinwah, Robert Ozuma, James Poyser, Rashad Smith, Glen Standridge and the song's sole producer Raphael Saadiq. The song follows the film and its soundtrack's common lyrical theme of personifying hip hop. It was released as the lead single from Brown Sugar on August 5, 2002, by MCA Records.

A commercial success, "Love of My Life (An Ode to Hip-Hop)" spent four weeks atop the US Hot R&B/Hip-Hop Songs and reached number nine on the Billboard Hot 100. Critically acclaimed, the song won the Soul Train Lady of Soul Award for Best Solo R&B/Soul Single and the Grammy Award for Best R&B Song. A year after its release, it was included on international editions of Badu's third studio album Worldwide Underground (2003).

Remix
The official remix of "Love of My Life (An Ode to Hip-Hop)", entitled "Love of My Life Worldwide" appeared on Badu's third studio album Worldwide Underground (2003). The remix featured guest raps by Queen Latifah, Bahamadia and Angie Stone, and sampled "Funk You Up" by the rap group the Sequence, of which Stone was a member. Another version of the remix, titled "Funk You Up! (Love Of My Life Remix)", features Badu rapping different lyrics.

Track listings and formats

US 12-inch vinyl
 "Love of My Life (An Ode to Hip Hop)" (radio edit) – 3:50
 "Love of My Life (An Ode to Hip Hop)" (instrumental) – 4:28
 "Love of My Life (An Ode to Hip Hop)" (album version) – 3:50
 "Love of My Life (An Ode to Hip Hop)" (a cappella) – 4:25

European CD single
 "Love of My Life (An Ode to Hip Hop)" (radio edit) – 3:50
 "Danger" (Mercury Remix) – 3:59

European maxi CD single
 "Love of My Life (An Ode to Hip Hop)" (radio edit) – 3:50
 "Love of My Life (An Ode to Hip Hop)" (album version) – 3:50
 "Love of My Life (An Ode to Hip Hop)" (instrumental) – 4:28
 "Danger" (Mercury Remix) – 3:59

Charts

Weekly charts

Year-end charts

Release history

References

2002 singles
Erykah Badu songs
Common (rapper) songs
Male–female vocal duets
Songs written by James Poyser
Songs written by Raphael Saadiq
Song recordings produced by Raphael Saadiq
Songs written by Erykah Badu
Songs written by Common (rapper)
2002 songs
MCA Records singles
Songs about music